Martin Halčin (born 22 May 1991) is a Slovak slalom canoeist who has competed at the international level since 2008. 

He won two silver medals in the K1 team event at the ICF Canoe Slalom World Championships, earning them in 2015 and 2021.

World Cup individual podiums

References

External links

Martin HALCIN at CanoeSlalom.net

Slovak male canoeists
Living people
1991 births
Medalists at the ICF Canoe Slalom World Championships
Sportspeople from Košice